The A8, called in  (Motorway of the West), is a motorway (freeway) in Portugal, connecting Lisbon and Leiria via Caldas da Rainha. The A17 connects to it in Marinha Grande and runs into Aveiro. A8 is operated by Auto-Estradas do Atlântico. It has a total length of 132 km. A trip between Lisbon and Leiria using the A8 will cost €9.05

Lisboa - Leiria

References 

Motorways in Portugal